Helcogramma serendip is a species of triplefin blenny in the genus Helcogramma. It was described by Wouter Holleman in 2007. This species is found only around the coasts of Sri Lanka and its specific name references the old Arabic name for Sri Lanka.

References

serendip
Taxa named by Wouter Holleman
Fish described in 2007